The 2013 Ricoh Women's British Open was played 1–4 August at the Old Course at St Andrews in St Andrews, Scotland. It was the 37th Women's British Open, and the 13th as a major championship on the LPGA Tour. It was the second Women's British Open at St Andrews, the first was six years earlier in 2007. ESPN televised the tournament in the United States and BBC Sport broadcast the event in the United Kingdom.

Stacy Lewis won her second major, two shots ahead of runners-up Na Yeon Choi and Hee Young Park. High winds on Saturday caused a suspension of play at mid-day until Sunday morning; the leaders played 36 holes on Sunday under clear skies and breezy conditions. It was Lewis' first win at the Women's British Open.

The win snapped at ten the longest streak in history without an American winning a women's major title.  Lewis was the last American to win, at the Kraft Nabisco Championship in April 2011, 28 months earlier. In between, the ten majors had all been won by Asian-born competitors.

Five years earlier, Lewis was a member of the winning Curtis Cup team in 2008, played at St Andrews. She won all five of her matches at the Old Course in her final amateur competition.

Inbee Park's pursuit of a fourth straight major came up short as she faded in the final two rounds to 
finish at 294 (+6), fourteen strokes back, in a tie for 42nd place.

Field
The field for the tournament was set at 144, and most earned exemptions based on past performance on the Ladies European Tour, the LPGA Tour, previous major championships, or with a high ranking in the Women's World Golf Rankings. The rest of the field earned entry by successfully competing in qualifying tournaments open to any female golfer, professional or amateur, with a low handicap.

There were 15 exemption categories for the 2013 Women's British Open.

The top 15 finishers (and ties) from the 2012 Women's British Open.
The top 10 Ladies European Tour members in the Women's World Golf Rankings not already exempt under category 1.
The top 30 LPGA Tour members in the Women's World Golf Rankings not already exempt under category 1.
The top 25 on the current LET money list not already exempt under category 1 or 2.
The top 40 on the current LPGA Tour money list not already exempt under category 1 or 3.
The top five on the current LPGA of Japan Tour (JLPGA) money list not already exempt under category 1, 2, 3 or 11.
Winners of any recognised LET or LPGA Tour events in the calendar year 2013.
Winners of the 2012 LET, LPGA, JLPGA and KLPGA money lists.
Winners of the last 10 editions of the Women's British Open.
Winners of the last five editions of one of the other three LPGA majors.
Winner of the 2012 Japan LPGA Tour Championship Ricoh Cup.
The leading five LPGA Tour members upon completion of 36 holes in the 2013 Manulife Financial LPGA Classic who have entered the Championship and who are not otherwise exempt.
The leading three LET members in the 2013 ISPS Handa Ladies European Masters, who have entered the Championship and who are not otherwise exempt.
The 2013 British Ladies Amateur champion, 2012 Ladies' British Open Amateur Stroke Play champion, 2012 U.S. Women's Amateur champion, 2012 International European Ladies Amateur Championship champion, and the Mark H. McCormack Medal holder provided they are still amateurs at the time of the Championship and a maximum of two other leading amateurs at the discretion of the Ladies' Golf Union.
Any players granted special exemptions from qualifying by the Championship Committee.

Past champions in the field

Made the cut

Missed the cut

Course

Previous length of the course for the Women's British Open:
 2007: , par 73   (#17 Road was played as a par 5)

Round summaries

First round
Thursday, 1 August 2013

Source:

Second round
Friday, 2 August 2013

Source:

Third round
Saturday, 3 August 2013
Sunday, 4 August 2013

Sunny skies for Saturday, but very high winds caused suspension of play just after noon, with those on the first page of the leaderboard yet to tee off. Play was not restarted, and the third round resumed early Sunday morning.

Source:

Final round
Sunday, 4 August 2013

The competitors kept their same pairing from the third round to expedite play, as the leaders had to complete 36 holes on Sunday. Lewis birdied the final two holes and waited for nearly an hour for the final pairing to finish.

Source:

Scorecard
Final round

Cumulative tournament scores, relative to par

Source:

References

External links

LPGA.com - Women's British Open - microsite
Ladies European Tour: Women's British Open
Ladies Golf Union: Women's British Open

Women's British Open
Golf tournaments in Scotland
British Open
Women's British Open
Women's British Open